The Ulanqab (Wulanchabu) Stadium is a multi-purpose stadium in Ulanqab, Inner Mongolia, China. It has a seating capacity of 30,000. Construction began on 7 June 2005 and the stadium was opened in 2009, costing 230 million yuan to build.

The stadium has been designated as the main venue for the 14th Inner Mongolia Games which will be held in Ulanqab in 2018. In preparation for the games, it was closed in June 2017 for comprehensive renovation and upgrading of facilities.

References

Football venues in China
Multi-purpose stadiums in China
Buildings and structures in Inner Mongolia
Sports venues completed in 2009
2009 establishments in China
Ulanqab